The warty frog is a frog in the family Brevicipitidae found in Tanzania and Kenya.

Warty frog may also refer to:

 Kerala warty frog, a frog found in India
 Nepal warty frog, a frog found in India, Bangladesh, Nepal, and Bhutan
 Pied warty frog, a frog found in India, Burma, China, Thailand, Cambodia, Vietnam, and Indonesia
 Warty mountain stream frog, a frog endemic to the Sierra Juárez, Oaxaca, Mexico
 Warty swamp frog, a frog native to southeastern Australia
 Warty water-holding frog, a frog native to Australia
 Warty webbed frog, a frog endemic to the Solomon Islands

See also

 Wart frog (disambiguation)

Animal common name disambiguation pages